Lutsel K'e Dene School is a JK-12 public school located in Łutselk'e, Northwest Territories, Canada. The school is the only public education option for youth in the settlement and serves approximately 74 students. The administration of the school is the responsibility of the South Slave Divisional Education Council (SSDEC).

Background

The Lutsel K'e Dene School has existed in various forms since 1960.

In 2011, the South Slave Divisional Education Council, on the recommendation of the Lutsel K'e District Education Authority, expanded the program at the school to include grades 11 and 12. Previously, students wishing to finish their high school education were required to attend classes in Fort Smith at Paul William Kaeser High School as a part of either regular boarding programs or the Western Arctic Leadership Program.

From the website of the SSDEC:

Lutsel K’e is home to the Lutsel K’e Dene School (K-12) with 70 students. With a dedicated teaching staff, and recent technology upgrades, the school serves
the educational needs of a predominantly Chipewyan student population. At Lutsel K’e Dene School, a high value is placed on the promotion of respect, self-worth,
community and educational standards from both the Dene and Western perspectives.

Dene Kede

The school makes extensive use of Dene Kede, a curriculum developed in the Northwest Territories, designed specifically for use in small Dene communities such as Lutsel K'e. The goal of the curriculum is to develop "capable Dene," with a strong focus on developing strong student relationships with the spiritual world, the land, other people, and themselves. Compared with their peers elsewhere in Canada, students in Lutsel K'e spend more significant amounts of educational time on the land and learning about their cultural heritage.

Recognition

In 2012, the staff of Lutsel K'e Dene School received praise from Governor General David Johnston for their work in improving learning outcomes at the school. As he notes in the referenced video, following the implementation of the South Slave Divisional Education Council's Leadership for Literacy initiative, the number of students scoring at or above the Canadian national standard went from 30 percent in 2006 to above 70 percent in 2012.

References

External links
Lutsel K’e Dene School at the South Slave Divisional Education Council

High schools in the Northwest Territories
Middle schools in the Northwest Territories
Elementary schools in the Northwest Territories